The autumn trial system was a special judicial system in the Qing dynasty of ancient China. During the Qing dynasty, people who committed crimes like subversion and treason were sentenced to death. In such cases, typically, criminals could not be amnestied. Nevertheless, people who committed crimes, like murdering a junior member in the family, might be sentenced to death penalty with a suspension , called "Zhan Jianhou" or "Jiao Jianhou" in Chinese. In such cases, the officers in the Board of Justice, the Court of Judicature and Revision, and the "Court of Justice" would determine whether to execute criminals sentenced to "Zhan Jianhou" or "Jiao Jianhou" in the autumn by a procedure called the "autumn trial".

After the autumn trial, around 10-20 percent of criminals sentenced to "Zhan Jianhou" or "Jiao Jianhou" would be executed, while other criminals could typically obtain a commutation or a suspension for one more year. A criminal having obtained suspensions in the autumn trial system for several times might also obtain a commutation de facto.

See also 
Capital punishment in China

Notes

References 

Qing dynasty
History of criminal justice